Sally Sitou (Chinese: 陳莎莉) is an Australian politician who is the Labor member for the Division of Reid as of the 2022 Australian federal election. She defeated the incumbent Liberal member, Fiona Martin.

Early years and background
Sally was born in Canley Vale, the second child of Chinese parents who fled Laos after the Vietnam War. She went to Canley Vale Public School and Sefton High School and completed a Bachelor of Arts (Psychology – Honours) at Macquarie University. She spent more than a decade working in the international education and international development sectors, and was most recently employed at the University of Sydney.

She is married with one child.

Politics 
Sally has been a member of the Australian Labor Party since 2006, working on a number of campaigns, including the 2007 Bennelong campaign when Maxine McKew defeated former Prime Minister John Howard. She worked as an adviser to Jason Clare MP, Member for Blaxland. In 2021 Sally was pre-selected as the ALP’s candidate for the Division of Reid and achieved a swing of 8.4 percent to win the seat in the May 2022 federal election.

References

External links
Website
 

Living people
Australian Labor Party members of the Parliament of Australia
Members of the Australian House of Representatives for Reid
Australian politicians of Chinese descent
University of Sydney alumni
Women members of the Australian House of Representatives
1982 births